The Palestinian Olympic Committee sent a team to compete at the  2008 Summer Olympics in Beijing, China. The Palestinian delegation consisted of two runners and two swimmers.

Athletics

Men

Women

Swimming
Men

Women

See also
 Palestine at the 2008 Summer Paralympics

References

Nations at the 2008 Summer Olympics
2008
Oly